Danish UC submarines may refer to one of the following three privately designed, built, and operated submarines by the inventor Peter Madsen and associates at Ubadsklubben Freya.

 , laid down 2001; launched 2002; decommissioned 2006; sunk 2008
 , launched 2005
 , launched 2008; confiscated 2017

Personal submarines